Enfield Automotive was an electric car manufacturer founded in the United Kingdom in the 1960s. Under the ownership of Greek millionaire Giannis Goulandris, production was moved to the Greek isle of Syros during the oil crisis of 1973, although the vehicles were, according to one report, sent back to be assembled on the Isle of Wight. (actually the cars were completely built on Syros and sent to Britain for installation of the batteries).

Models

Enfield 465

The Enfield 465 was a small 2+2-seater electric car built only in prototype form in 1969. It was equipped with a 48 V,  electric motor and had an ICI royal plastic body with no metal chassis. It is believed that only three were Built but only two remain as one failed the crash testing. The rear axle came from a Bond Bug with the Motor parrell to it.

Enfield 8000

The Enfield 8000 (also known the E8000 ECC or "Electric City Car") was similar to the 465, but with an  motor and aluminium body. 120 Enfield 8000s were built on Syros  in the mid-1970s, of which 65 were used by the Electricity Council and southern English electricity boards.

The E8000ECC had passed all the necessary tests for production in the United Kingdom and was on its way to be produced in the United States of America. Then Governor of California Ronald Reagan sent a cargo plane to have three E8000ECCs moved to California in support of his Clean Air legislation.  However, the E8000ECC was never produced in the United States.  The unique aerodynamics of the E8000ECC were not based on traditional industry principles and ideas.  They were based on designs made by Konstantine Adraktas, the Chairman and Managing Technical Director of Enfield. The car was eventually produced in Greece after the company was incorporated into Neorion (also owned by Mr. Goulandris) and renamed Enfield-Neorion.

Key Characteristics

It had an aluminum body to guard against corrosion.
It was available in a "Bicini" version which had a body composed of simple flat panels and was never crash tested.
A leather interior was available.
Early models no gear lever, reverse was entered with the use of switch.
It was based on widely available components and parts for easy maintenance and worldwide replacement part availability.
It had an on-board charger (which recharged batteries fully while freewheeling downhill in the Alps.)

References

Electric city cars
Defunct motor vehicle manufacturers of England
1960s cars
1970s cars
Electric vehicle manufacturers of the United Kingdom
Companies based on the Isle of Wight